The Apertura 2014 Copa MX Final was the final of the Apertura 2014 Copa MX, the fifth edition of the Copa MX under its current format and 72nd overall organized by the Mexican Football Federation, the governing body of association football in Mexico.

The final was contested in a single leg format between Liga MX clubs, Santos Laguna and Puebla. The leg was hosted by Santos Laguna at Estadio Corona in Torreón, Coahuila on November 4, 2014. The winner earned a spot to face the winner of the Clausura 2015 edition in the 2015 Supercopa MX to qualify as Mexico 3 to the 2016 Copa Libertadores.

Venue
Due to the tournament's regulations the higher seed among both finalists during the group stage would host the final, thus Estadio Corona hosted the final. The home venue of Santos Laguna since 2009, it has staged Liga MX and CONCACAF Champions League finals, including the first leg of the 2013 CONCACAF Champions League Finals where Santos Laguna lost to Monterrey. Estadio Corona also staged eight matches of the 2011 FIFA U-17 World Cup, which included most of Group D matches and some knockout stage matches including the semifinal between Mexico and Germany. The Mexico senior national team has also hosted international matches against North Korea, Brazil and El Salvador at the stadium.

Background
Santos Laguna, has never won the tournament while Puebla has won it four previous times. Before reaching this final the last time Santos Laguna reached a final of any kind was the 2013 CONCACAF Champions League Finals where Santos Laguna lost to Monterrey 4–2 on aggregate. Puebla previously reached any type of final during the Apertura 2006 Primera A season when they defeated Salamanca 6–5 on penalty kicks in the final.

Santos Laguna won four, drew one and lost one group stage match and scored 12 goals during group stage, as they were seeded third, they eliminated Guadalajara in the quarterfinals and Tigres UANL in the semifinals.

Puebla won four, drew one and lost one group stage match and scored six goals, as they were seeded fifth, they eliminated Atlas on penalty kicks in the quarterfinals and Lobos BUAP on penalty kicks in the semifinals, both teams are from Liga MX.

Road to the finals

Note: In all results below, the score of the finalist is given first.

Match

References

Copa MX Finals
2014–15 in Mexican football
Santos Laguna matches
Club Puebla  matches
Copa MX Final 2016 Final Apertura